David Ortiz  is a Democratic member of Colorado State House of Representatives. Ortiz is the representative for Colorado's 38th House District, which situated in western Arapahoe County and includes the community of Columbine Valley as well as most the town of Littleton and the Southglenn neighborhood of Centennial.

Ortiz sits on both the House Public & Behavioral Health & Human Services Committee and the Health & Insurance Committee. He is the first bisexual legislator and the first wheelchair user to serve in the chamber.

Background
In 2012, Ortiz survived a helicopter crash while serving as a pilot in the U.S. Army in Afghanistan. The accident left him paralyzed from the waist down. Following his recovery at Craig Hospital, Ortiz worked as a lobbyist for veterans and behavioral health issues through the United Veterans Committee.

Colorado State Legislature  
Ortiz was elected to the state House in 2020, defeating newly appointed Republican Representative Richard Champion by a margin of 55.57% to 44.43%. After a 400-vote loss in the district two years prior, HD38 was a major target for state Democrats during the 2020 cycle.

During the 2021 legislative session, Ortiz was the prime sponsor for 24 bills, more than any other freshman House representative. These sponsored bills included HB21-1110, which adopted the public accessibility standards established in the Americans with Disabilities Act into Colorado state law.

References 

1982 births
Living people
Democratic Party members of the Colorado House of Representatives
21st-century American politicians